Taquet is a surname of French origin. People with this name include:

 Adrien Taquet (born 1977), French politician
 Marie and Emile Taquet (1898–1989 and 1893–1971 respectively), Belgian married couple who saved Jewish children from the Holocaust
 Philippe Taquet (born 1940), French paleontologist

See also
 :fr:Taquet (homonymie), a disambiguation page in French Wikipedia
 

Surnames of French origin